Southern States University (SSU) is a private for-profit university with its headquarters in San Diego, California. It is owned by Tepper Technologies, Inc., and has three locations, two in Southern California (San Diego and Irvine) and one in Nevada (Las Vegas). SSU is accredited by the Accrediting Council for Independent Colleges and Schools.

History
The institution was founded in 1983, originally in Orange County, California. Its current owner is Tepper Technologies, Inc., which purchased it in 2005.

Academics 
Southern States University offers a Bachelor of Business Administration (BBA), Master of Business Administration (MBA), and Master of Science in Information Technology (MSIT). Certificate programs are also offered in the areas of Marketing, Business, and Information Technology.

It is accredited by the Accrediting Council for Independent Colleges and Schools. It is also approved by the California Bureau of Private Postsecondary Education and the Nevada Commission on Postsecondary Education.

Locations
SSU is based in San Diego, California. It has campuses in San Diego, Irvine, and Las Vegas.

References

External links
 Official website

For-profit universities and colleges in the United States
Private universities and colleges in California
Universities and colleges in San Diego
Universities and colleges in Orange County, California
Newport Beach, California
1983 establishments in California
Educational institutions established in 1983
Education in Irvine, California